Larnaca is an Asian genus of Orthopterans, sometimes known as 'leaf-folding crickets', in the subfamily Gryllacridinae and tribe Gryllacridini.  Species have been recorded from: southern China, Indochina and western Malesia.

Species 
The Orthoptera Species File lists:
subgenus Larnaca Walker, 1869
 Larnaca emarginata Bian, Guo & Shi, 2015
 Larnaca eugenii (Griffini, 1914)
 Larnaca fasciata Walker, 1869 - type species (locality Sarawak)
 Larnaca infolda Du, Bian & Shi, 2017
 Larnaca jacobsoni (Griffini, 1913)
 Larnaca larnacoides (Karny, 1937)
 Larnaca manteri (Griffini, 1911)
 Larnaca microptera (Karny, 1926)
 Larnaca montana (Griffini, 1908)
 Larnaca nigrata (Brunner von Wattenwyl, 1888)
 Larnaca nigricornis Ingrisch, 2018
 Larnaca palliceps (Karny, 1926)
 Larnaca pendleburyi (Karny, 1926)
 Larnaca phetchaburi Gorochov, 2003
 Larnaca ridicula (Zacher, 1909)
 Larnaca samkos Ingrisch, 2018
 Larnaca squamiptera Ingrisch, 2018
 Larnaca subaptera Ingrisch, 2018
 Larnaca tenuis Ingrisch, 2018
 Larnaca vietnamensis Gorochov, 2003
subgenus Paralarnaca Gorochov, 2003
 Larnaca distincta (Brunner von Wattenwyl, 1888)
 Larnaca johni (Griffini, 1911)

References

External links 
 
 

Ensifera genera
Gryllacrididae
Orthoptera of Indo-China
Orthoptera of Malesia